Lothar Franz von Schönborn-Buchheim (4 October 1655 – 30 January 1729) was the Archbishop-Elector of Mainz from 1694 to 1729 and the Bishop of Bamberg from 1693 to 1729. As Archbishop of Mainz, he was also Archchancellor of the Holy Roman Empire. Lothar Franz von Schönborn is known for commissioning a number of Baroque buildings, such as the palace Schloss Weissenstein.

Family 
Lothar Franz was born in Steinheim am Main, now a suburb of Hanau, on 4 October 1655 to Count  (1607-1668) and Maria Ursula von . He was a nephew of Johann Philipp von Schönborn, Archbishop of Mainz from 1647 until 1673, and a grand nephew of Georg Friedrich von Greiffenklau, Archbishop of Mainz from 1626 until 1629. Furthermore, he was an uncle to the Schönborn-Buchheim branch which included Johann Philipp Franz, Friedrich Karl, Damian Hugo Philipp and Franz Georg.

Life 
He was educated at the Jesuit College in Aschaffenburg. In 1665 Lothar Franz was appointed Domizellar (canon) of Würzburg Cathedral, 1667 in Bamberg Cathedral. He received a prebendary at Mainz Cathedral in 1674. Lothar Franz made his Grand Tour through the Netherlands, France and Italy. His Biennium (two-year period of preparation) he attended from 1673 to 1675 in Vienna. During this time he kept a pro-imperial life stance. He was  appointed canon of Bamberg in 1681 and in Würzburg in 1683. For the Bishop of Bamberg, he travelled in various diplomatic missions and was appointed President of the Court Chamber. In 1689 he was Scholastikus (schoolmaster) and curator in Bamberg and canon of Mainz. Still being a canon, he already influenced the artistic design of Schloss Gaibach at Volkach after 1694.

In 1693, Lothar Franz was elected Bishop of Bamberg. In September 1694 he was appointed coadjutor bishop of Anselm Franz von Ingelheim in rivalry to Franz Ludwig von Pfalz-Neuburg. Despite an opposing recommendation by the Emperor he succeeded Anselm Franz in 1695. During his reign, he increased taxation of the cathedral chapter and eroded some of its rights. In 1707 he was instrumental in the conversion of the Protestant Elizabeth Christina of Brunswick-Wolfenbüttel to Catholicism. 

In 1711 he ensured the election of Charles VI of Austria as the Holy Roman Emperor, and crowned him in Frankfurt Cathedral. Lothar Franz was rewarded by Charles for his loyalty with 100,000 guldens with which he began the construction of Schloss Weißenstein in Pommersfelden, a Baroque palace with the largest privately owned art gallery of Germany, still today owned by the Schönborn family. In 1726, Charles VI granted Palanok Castle with Mukacheve, Chynadiyovo and 200 villages in the Kingdom of Hungary (today part of the Ukraine), to Elector Lothar Franz who had sent him troops to defeat Francis II Rákóczi, whose property it had previously been, and then continued to give the emperor political support. The estate, one of the largest in Eastern Europe, remained in the family well into the 20th century.

Lothar Franz von Schönborn died on 30 January 1729 at Mainz.

Literature 
R.H. Thompson: Lothar Franz von Schönborn and the Diplomacy of the Electorate of Mainz. From the Treaty of Ryswick to the Outbreak of the War of the Spanish Succession, Springer Netherland 1973;

External links

References

1655 births
1729 deaths
People from Hanau
Archbishop-Electors of Mainz
Lothar Franz